On 26 August 2009, an Antonov An-12 crashed into a cemetery near Brazzaville, Congo.

Aircraft
The aircraft involved was an 43 year-old Antonov An-12BK of Aéro-Frêt, manufactured in 1966 and registered as TN-AIA.

Accident
The aircraft departed from Brazzaville Maya-Maya International Airport bound for Pointe Noire Airport carrying food, a minibus and three other vehicles. All 5 Ukrainian crew members and the Congolese passenger died on impact. Eyewitnesses reported that one of the wings was on fire before the crash, and that the aircraft broke up in mid-air. The carriage of the passenger was illegal, as the Republic of the Congo bans AN-12s from use as passenger aircraft.

Investigation
The accident was investigated by the Congolese National Agency for Civil Aviation.

References

2009 disasters in the Republic of the Congo
August 2009 events in Africa
Aviation accidents and incidents in 2009
Accidents and incidents involving the Antonov An-12
Aviation accidents and incidents in the Republic of the Congo
Airliner accidents and incidents caused by in-flight fires